Tenzompa (Meaning of the huichol from: "Mujer Bonita"; i.e.

It has a Huichol indigenous population of 6.54%, the name of this community is due to the Tenzompa River that surrounds the community while to the north it is surrounded by the homonymous mountain range, part of the Sierra Madre Occidental, its founding year is currently unknown although it is known that it was founded before the Spanish arrival and for having been founded on a hill  from its current location due to some ruins found.

References 

Populated places in Jalisco